Peeter Puusepp (also Peeter Puusep; 22 February 1868 Loodi Parish, Viljandi County – 19 May 1949 Geislingen, Germany) was an Estonian politician. He was a member of I Riigikogu. On 21 October 1921, he resigned his position and he was replaced by Tõnis Pedak.

References

1868 births
1949 deaths
Members of the Riigikogu, 1920–1923
Members of the Riiginõukogu